Linas Kleiza (born January 3, 1985) is a Lithuanian professional basketball executive and former player. In 2010, he was the Alphonso Ford EuroLeague Top Scorer Trophy winner and a member of the All-EuroLeague First Team.

Kleiza represented the senior Lithuanian national basketball team in international competitions. He led them to a bronze medal in the 2010 FIBA World Championship, and was chosen to the All-Tournament Team. He also won a silver medal in the EuroBasket 2013, earning an All-EuroBasket Team selection, and a bronze medal in the EuroBasket 2007.

Early years
Kleiza was born in Kaunas, Lithuania. At 16 years old he moved to the United States where he attended Montrose Christian School and graduated in 2003. He played on the Lithuanian Junior National Team that won the silver medal at the 2003 FIBA Under-19 World Cup. He led the tournament in scoring, averaging 29.1 points per game on 58 percent shooting. As a senior, he was named a third-team Parade All-American.

College career
Kleiza played college basketball at the University of Missouri. He was named Honorable Mention All-Big 12 by the league coaches as a sophomore. He also earned All-Tournament honors at the 2005 Big 12 tournament after averaging 29.5 points and 9 rebounds per game.

Professional career

Denver Nuggets
Kleiza was selected by the Portland Trail Blazers with the 27th pick of the 2005 NBA draft. The Trail Blazers then dealt his draft rights, along with Ricky Sanchez to the Denver Nuggets in exchange for Jarrett Jack. Kleiza was seldom used in his rookie season. He averaged 3.5 points and 8.5 minutes per game.

He improved on his three-point shooting in his sophomore year, making 83–221, after only making two three-pointers in his rookie year. He also saw some more time on the court and averaged 7.6 points on 42 percent shooting in 18.8 minutes per game. After the season, Denver picked up their team option on his contract for another season.

Kleiza became a big part of Denver's rotation in the 2007–08 season, mostly backing up Denver's starting small forward Carmelo Anthony. However, he was involved in a lot of trade talks, most notably a trade involving Ron Artest of the Sacramento Kings. On January 17, 2008, Kleiza scored a career high 41 points against the Utah Jazz. His scoring average was up to 11.1 points per game and his shooting percentage was up to 47 percent.

Many expected Kleiza to make a similar leap in production in his fourth year in the league. However, most of his season averages were slightly off from the 2007–08 season. He averaged 9.9 points on 45 percent shooting. His minutes dwindled down in the playoffs. The Nuggets' head coach George Karl, said Kleiza played fewer minutes because he is not a playmaker.

Olympiacos
On August 10, 2009, Kleiza agreed to a two-year, $12.2 million (€8.6 million euros) gross income contract with the Greek League team Olympiacos. He averaged 17.2 points per game and grabbed 6.4 rebounds per game in the EuroLeague, reaching the EuroLeague Finals with the Reds. Kleiza led the league in scoring, thus winning the Alphonso Ford EuroLeague Top Scorer Trophy, becoming the first Lithuanian to do so.

Toronto Raptors
On July 7, 2010, Kleiza terminated his contract with Olympiacos. He was signed by the Toronto Raptors to a four-year, $20 million gross income offer sheet. In January 2011, he suffered a serious meniscal tear in his right knee and was out for the remainder of the 2010–11 season. On February 1, 2011, Kleiza underwent arthroscopic surgery. He returned to court on January 11, 2012, in a game against the Sacramento Kings. In 14 minutes of game action, he scored 10 points, grabbed 3 rebounds and dished out an assist. On July 16, 2013, the Raptors used the amnesty clause to waive Kleiza.

Fenerbahçe Ülker
On July 26, 2013, Kleiza signed a two-year contract with Fenerbahçe. On July 1, 2014, he officially parted ways with Fenerbahçe.

Olimpia Milano
On July 21, 2014, Kleiza signed a one-year deal with the Italian team Olimpia Milano. After the season he withdrew from professionally playing basketball for unlimited period of time due to knee problems, but did not announce his retirement from the sport.

National team career

Kleiza has also played with the senior men's Lithuanian national basketball team. He played at the 2006 FIBA World Championship and he won the bronze medal at the EuroBasket 2007 and the silver medal at the EuroBasket 2013. He also played with Lithuania at the 2008 Summer Olympics. After a poor performance in EuroBasket 2009, Kleiza led his team to a bronze medal in the 2010 FIBA World Championship, averaging 19.0 points, 7.1 rebounds, and 1.4 assists per game. He was chosen for the All-Tournament Team. Because of his knee injury, he was not able to help Lithuania at EuroBasket 2011.

Executive career
On July 13, 2017, it was announced that Kleiza received part of the BC Rytas shares from Antanas Guoga. He was also named vice president of the club and its sports director. On February 8, 2020, Kleiza announced his decision to leave BC Rytas due to disagreements with other executives of the team. In May 2020, it was announced that Kleiza gave up his shares in the team to other shareholders.

Personal life
Kleiza and his wife, whom he married in June 2014, have one son.

Awards and accomplishments
 FIBA Under-19 World Championship silver medal: 2003
 EuroBasket bronze medal: 2007
 Greek Cup winner: 2010
 Alphonso Ford EuroLeague Top Scorer Trophy: 2010
 All-EuroLeague First Team: 2010
 FIBA World Championship bronze medal: 2010
 FIBA World Championship All-Tournament Team: 2010
 EuroBasket silver medal: 2013
 EuroBasket All-Tournament Team: 2013

Career statistics

NBA

Regular season

|-
| style="text-align:left;"|
| style="text-align:left;"|Denver
| 61 || 2 || 8.5 || .445 || .154 || .704 || 1.9 || .2 || .2 || .2 || 3.5
|-
| style="text-align:left;"|
| style="text-align:left;"|Denver
| 79 || 14 || 18.8 || .422 || .376 || .852 || 3.4 || .6 || .4 || .2 || 7.6
|-
| style="text-align:left;"|
| style="text-align:left;"|Denver
| 79 || 13 || 23.9 || .472 || .339 || .770 || 4.2 || 1.2 || .6 || .2 || 11.1
|-
| style="text-align:left;"|
| style="text-align:left;"|Denver
| 82 || 7 || 22.2 || .447 || .326 || .725 || 4.0 || .8 || .4 || .2 || 9.9
|-
| style="text-align:left;"|
| style="text-align:left;"|Toronto
| 39 || 23 || 26.5 || .438 || .298 || .631 || 4.5 || 1.0 || .5 || .2 || 11.2
|-
| style="text-align:left;"|
| style="text-align:left;"|Toronto
| 49 || 3 || 21.6 || .402 || .346 || .810 || 4.1 || .9 || .5 || .1 || 9.7
|-
| style="text-align:left;"|
| style="text-align:left;"|Toronto
| 20 || 3 || 18.8 || .333 || .303 || .842 || 2.6 || .8 || .2 || .1 || 7.4
|- class="sortbottom"
| style="text-align:center;" colspan="2"|Career
| 409 || 65 || 20.0 || .435 || .335 || .763 || 3.6 || .8 || .4 || .2 || 8.7

Playoffs

|-
| style="text-align:left;"|2006
| style="text-align:left;"|Denver
| 3 || 0 || 4.7 || .375 || .000 || .000 || 1.3 || .7 || .0 || .0 || 2.0
|-
| style="text-align:left;"|2007
| style="text-align:left;"|Denver
| 5 || 0 || 13.2 || .231 || .167 || .500 || 1.6 || .4 || .0 || .0 || 1.6
|-
| style="text-align:left;"|2008
| style="text-align:left;"|Denver
| 4 || 3 || 30.5 || .537 || .214 || .692 || 6.5 || .8 || .3 || .0 || 14.0
|-
| style="text-align:left;"|2009
| style="text-align:left;"|Denver
| 14 || 0 || 15.0 || .470 || .425 || .750 || 3.2 || .5 || .4 || .1 || 6.9
|- class="sortbottom"
| style="text-align:center;" colspan="2"|Career
| 26 || 3 || 15.8 || .461 || .344 || .718 || 3.2 || .5 || .2 || .0 || 6.4

EuroLeague

|-
| style="text-align:left;"|2009–10
| style="text-align:left;"|Olympiacos
| 22 || 21 || 30.4 || .480 || .349 || .798 || 6.5 || 1.3 || .7 || .2 || style="background:#cfecec;"|17.1 || 17.9
|-
| style="text-align:left;"|2013–14
| style="text-align:left;"|Fenerbahçe
| 24 || 7 || 21.3 || .454 || .305 || .918 || 3.5 || .8 || .4 || .1 || 10.1 || 9.8
|-
| style="text-align:left;"|2014–15
| style="text-align:left;"|Milano
| 24 || 7 || 19.5 || .424 || .352 || .788 || 3.1 || .3 || .2 || .1 || 7.3 || 5.3
|- class="sortbottom"
| style="text-align:center;" colspan="2"|Career
| 70 || 35 || 23.5 || .459 || .339 || .838 || 4.3 || .8 || .4 || .1 || 11.4 || 10.8

See also
 
 List of European basketball players in the United States

References

External links

 
 
 Linas Kleiza at Greek Basket League 
 Linas Kleiza at EuroLeague
 
 Linas Kleiza at Lega Basket 

1985 births
Living people
2006 FIBA World Championship players
2010 FIBA World Championship players
Basketball players at the 2008 Summer Olympics
Basketball players at the 2012 Summer Olympics
Denver Nuggets players
Fenerbahçe men's basketball players
Greek Basket League players
Lega Basket Serie A players
Lithuanian expatriate basketball people in Canada
Lithuanian expatriate basketball people in Greece
Lithuanian expatriate basketball people in Italy
Lithuanian expatriate basketball people in the United States
Lithuanian expatriate basketball people in Turkey
Lithuanian men's basketball players
Missouri Tigers men's basketball players
National Basketball Association players from Lithuania
Olimpia Milano players
Olympiacos B.C. players
Olympic basketball players of Lithuania
Parade High School All-Americans (boys' basketball)
Portland Trail Blazers draft picks
Power forwards (basketball)
Small forwards
Basketball players from Kaunas
Toronto Raptors players